Craig Bryan Defoy (born 27 March 1947) is a Welsh professional golfer. He finished fourth in the 1971 Open Championship.

Professional career
Defoy had a successful start to his tournament career, winning three age-restricted events, the Gor-Ray Under-24 Championship in 1968 and Lord Derby’s Under-23 Professional Tournament and the Energen Junior Match Play, for under-25s, in 1969.

Defoy later played on the European Tour where he did not win but had three second-place finishes: 1973 Spanish Open, 1976 Sun Alliance Match Play Championship, and 1977 Skol Lager Individual (playoff loss). Playing with Derek Small he was also runner-up in the 1974 Sumrie-Bournemouth Better-Ball, losing a playoff. He won five times on the Safari Circuit between 1970 and 1973.

Defoy also played on the European Seniors Tour where his best finish was as runner-up in the 1997 Jersey Seniors Open and in the 2001 SSL International Sodexho Match Play Championship.

Defoy represented Wales seven times in the World Cup and won the Welsh Professional Championship four times.

Professional wins
1968 Gor-Ray Under-24 Championship
1969 Lord Derby’s Under-23 Professional Tournament, Energen Junior Match Play
1970 Cock of the North
1971 Mufulira Open
1972 Zambia Open, Mufulira Open
1973 Zambia Open
1975 Welsh Professional Championship
1977 Welsh Professional Championship
1981 Welsh Professional Championship
1982 Welsh Professional Championship
1999 PGA Senior Club Professional Championship

Playoff record
European Tour playoff record (0–1)

Results in major championships

Note: Defoy only played in the Open Championship.

CUT = missed the half-way cut (3rd round cut in 1969, 1975 and 1983)
"T" = tied

Team appearances
World Cup (representing Wales): 1971, 1973, 1974, 1975, 1976, 1977, 1978
Double Diamond International (representing Wales): 1971, 1972, 1973, 1974, 1975, 1976, 1977
Philip Morris International (representing Wales): 1975
PGA Cup (representing Great Britain and Ireland): 1981 (tie), 1984 (winners), 1996 (tie, non-playing captain), 1998 (non-playing captain)
Hennessy Cognac Cup (representing Wales): 1984

References

External links

Welsh male golfers
European Tour golfers
European Senior Tour golfers
People from McKean County, Pennsylvania
1947 births
Living people